The Women's International Squash Players Association (WISPA) was the governing body for the women's professional squash circuit between 1983 and 2011. The WISPA World Tour involved over 80 tournaments annually worldwide. Over 200 players were registered with the WISPA.

The goals of the association were to:

 Enable more players to consider a career in professional squash economically viable through the development of a world tour;
 Produce and publish world rankings;
 Increase exposure for the sport and its players;
 Encourage professionalism among its members;
 Raise the administrative standards at events;
 Increase the level of support and advice offered to promoters; and
 Improve communication and relationships with other squash organizations and the press.

The new women's squash game is governed now by the Women's Squash Association (WSA).

See also
 Women's Squash Association
 Professional Squash Association

References

External links
Official WISPA Website 
Squash Club & Courts

International sports organizations
 Wom
Squash organizations
Women's squash
Sports organizations established in 1983
1983 establishments in the United Kingdom